Live in Mexico City is a live recording of a performance of ambient and drone by Bass Communion, the musical project of British musician Steven Wilson, with Mexican noise improvisation group Pig, in Laboratorio De Arte Alameda, Mexico City on 27 February 2008. It was limited to 500 copies in screen printed covers, available in 5 different color cover/vinyl combinations, 100 of each. Since 7 May 2009 the entire album is available as a digital download from the Burning Shed online store.

Track listing

Personnel

 Steven Wilson - guitar, laptop
 Andres Solis - turntables
 Rogelio Sosa - voice
 Daniel Goldaracena - devices

References 

2008 EPs
Bass Communion albums
2008 live albums
Live EPs
Important Records albums

nl:Dronework